Local elections were held in Makati on May 13, 2013, within the Philippine general election. The voters elected for the elective local posts in the city: the mayor, vice mayor, the two congressmen, and the sixteen councilors, eight in each of the city's two legislative districts.

Mayoral and vice mayoral election
Incumbent Mayor Jejomar Erwin "Junjun" Binay is running for his second term under United Nationalist Alliance. His running mate is former city administrator Marge De Veyra.  His opponent for mayoralty race is a lawyer Renato "Rene" Bondal, an independent candidate whose running mate is incumbent Vice Mayor Romulo "Kid" Peña Jr.

Congressional election

Incumbent 1st District Representative Monique Lagdameo won on 2010 election with a 0.19% margin over her closest rival, Maria Lourdes Locsin, wife of former Rep. Teodoro Locsin, Jr. This year, she is running for her reelection under UNA, facing Edilberto Magsaysay, Virgilio Batalla, and Miguel Lopez, Jr.

Incumbent 2nd District Representative Abigail Binay is running for reelection. Her opponent is Joel Sarza, who is running as an independent.

Candidates

Team Binay

Results

Mayoral election

Vice-mayoral election

Congressional election

1st District
Monique Lagdameo is the incumbent.

2nd District

Abigail Binay is the incumbent.

City Council Election
Each of Makati's two legislative districts elects eight councilors to the City Council. The eight candidates with the highest number of votes wins the seats per district.

Of the incumbent councilors elected in 2010, two are not seeking re-election:
Salvador Pangilinan, not running.

Results

1st District

|colspan=5 bgcolor=black|

2nd District

|colspan=5 bgcolor=black|

References

External links
Official website of the Commission on Elections
 Official website of National Movement for Free Elections (NAMFREL)
Official website of the Parish Pastoral Council for Responsible Voting (PPCRV)

2013 Philippine local elections
Elections in Makati
2013 elections in Metro Manila